Beatriz Haddad Maia won the women's singles title at the 2022 Birmingham Classic, after Zhang Shuai retired from the final with the scoreline at 5–4 due to a neck injury. By winning the title, Haddad Maia extended her winning streak to 10 consecutive matches.

Ons Jabeur was the defending champion, but she chose to play in Berlin instead.

Seeds

Draw

Finals

Top half

Bottom half

Qualifying

Seeds

Qualifiers

Lucky loser

Qualifying draw

First qualifier

Second qualifier

Third qualifier

Fourth qualifier

Fifth qualifier

Sixth qualifier

References 

2022 Birmingham Classic - 1
2022 WTA Tour